Juliana O'Connor-Connolly is a Caymanian politician, former Speaker of the Legislative Assembly of the Cayman Islands and former Premier of the Cayman Islands.

O'Connor-Connolly currently serves as the Member of Parliament for the constituency of Cayman Brac East, serving her seventh term in the Parliament of the Cayman Islands.

First elected to the Legislative Assembly in 1996, she is the first woman to represent the Sister Islands. Born and raised on Cayman Brac, she first pursued a career in teaching but later received a law degree from the University of Liverpool through the Truman Bodden Law School and was a practising attorney before entering politics.

In 1997 O'Connor-Connolly became Cayman's first female minister when she was chosen to fill a vacancy on Executive Council as the Minister of Community Affairs, Sports, Women, Youth and Culture. O'Connor-Connolly had previously served as Speaker of the Legislative Assembly from November 2001 to October 2003.

From October 2003 to April 2005 she served as Minister for Planning, Communications, District Administration and Information Technology. During her tenure, Hurricane Ivan devastated the island in September 2004. O'Connor-Connolly was a minister in within the government whose collective decision at that time was to turn away two British warships that had arrived the day after the storm with supplies. This decision was met by outrage from the Islanders who thought that it should have been their decision to make.

Following one term in the opposition benches. O'Connor-Connolly was elected Deputy Premier during the Cayman Islands general election in 2009, and in addition to assuming the post of Deputy Premier, she served as Minister of District Administration, Works, Lands and Agriculture. In 2012 O'Connor-Connolly assumed the post of Premier of the Cayman Islands she also served as Minister of Finance, District Administration, Works, Lands and Agriculture.

O'Connor-Connolly was the first-ever female Premier of the Cayman Islands, serving as Premier of from 19 December 2012 until 29 May 2013. Prior to becoming Premier, she was the territory's Deputy Premier serving from November 2009 until December 2012.

Following the 2013 Cayman Islands general election she crossed the floor to join the People's Progressive Movement party and in May 2013 she was appointed as Speaker of the Cayman Islands Legislative Assembly, leaving this post in May 2017. Following the 2017 Cayman Islands general election She is served as Minister of Education, Youth, Sports, Agriculture and Lands.

During debate in the Legislative Assembly, following the same-sex marriage ruling by Chief Justice Anthony Smellie on 29 March 2019, O'Connor-Connolly described the day of the ruling as "black Friday" for the Cayman Islands. She encouraged Caymanians to do what they could to object to the planned wedding between two women, even to the point of interrupting the wedding itself. The Education Minister had used the morning prayer before the debate to refer to "cruise passengers with alternative lifestyles" causing the streets of George Town to resemble Sodom and Gomorrah.

The education minister has been a fervent opponent of the Domestic Partnership Bill and any legislation that supported same-sex couples' right to a private life; describing it as "this evil that is being forced upon us". She was one of two Cabinet ministers who voted against the legislation brought by government in July to address the longstanding breach by the Caymanian authorities of Cayman's Bill of Rights and the European Convention on Human Rights.

Following the 2021 Cayman Islands general election, she again crossed the floor to align with a group of independents to form a government on the morning before Parliament had its first sitting, citing that "her constituents have expressed in no uncertain terms that Cayman Brac and Little Cayman need a Minister in the Government". This was her second switch of allegiance, this time to avoid the loss of a cabinet position.

Footnotes

Living people
Year of birth missing (living people)
Premiers of the Cayman Islands
Cayman Democratic Party politicians
Caymanian women in politics
Women heads of government of non-sovereign entities
People from Cayman Brac
Alumni of the University of Liverpool
Members of the Parliament of the Cayman Islands
20th-century British women politicians
21st-century British women politicians
20th-century British politicians
21st-century British politicians
Agriculture ministers of the Cayman Islands
Land management ministers of the Cayman Islands
Communication ministers of the Cayman Islands
Culture ministers of the Cayman Islands
Education ministers of the Cayman Islands
Labour ministers of the Cayman Islands
Planning ministers of the Cayman Islands
Sports ministers of the Cayman Islands
Youth ministers of the Cayman Islands
Women's ministers of the Cayman Islands